Melba Acosta Febo is a corporate executive, attorney, and certified public accountant. She is a former president of the Government Development Bank of Puerto Rico and a former chief public finance officer of Puerto Rico. Acosta also served as the Secretary of the Treasury of Puerto Rico, director of the Puerto Rico Office of Management and Budget and chief of staff of the municipality of San Juan.

Private sector career
In the private sector, she held various corporate positions at R&G Financial Corporation, such as chief administrative officer, corporate risk manager, and chief financial officer (CFO). She was also a corporate counsel at Puerto Rico's largest law firm, McConnell Valdés, LLC, and a tax consultant with Price Waterhouse. Acosta holds a BBA in accounting and a JD, both from the University of Puerto Rico, Rio Piedras, and an MBA from the Harvard Business School, where she was an Eli Lilly scholar. She has been a member of the board of directors of the Puerto Rico Museum of Art (Chairwoman, Treasurer, and Secretary), the Fundacion Luis Munoz Marin (Treasurer, Secretary) and United Way of Puerto Rico.

References

American chief financial officers
Women chief financial officers
Harvard Business School alumni
Puerto Rican women in business
Puerto Rican businesspeople
Puerto Rican business executives
Living people
Members of the 16th Cabinet of Puerto Rico
People from Arecibo, Puerto Rico
Secretaries of Treasury of Puerto Rico
Presidents of the Puerto Rico Government Development Bank
Directors of the Puerto Rico Office of Management and Budget
21st-century Puerto Rican women politicians
21st-century Puerto Rican politicians
Year of birth missing (living people)